Kimball County is a county in the U.S. state of Nebraska. As of the 2010 United States Census, the population was 3,821. Its county seat is Kimball. The county was formed in 1888 and named after railroad pioneer Thomas Lord Kimball.

In the Nebraska license plate system, Kimball County is represented by the prefix 71 (it was the county having the seventy-first-largest number of vehicles registered in the state when the license plate system was established in 1922).

Geography
The terrain of Kimball County consists of rolling hills sloping to the east. The flatter portions are mainly used for agriculture, mostly dry farming with a modest amount of center pivot irrigation. A small drainage, Lodgepole Creek, feeds into the Oliver Reservoir, in the western central part of the county. The highest natural point in Nebraska, Panorama Point at 5,424 feet (1,653 m), is located in Kimball County.

The FIPS code of Kimball county is 31105.

Major highways
  Interstate 80
  U.S. Highway 30
  Nebraska Highway 71

Adjacent counties

 Banner County – north
 Cheyenne County – east
 Logan County, Colorado – southeast
 Weld County, Colorado – southwest
 Laramie County, Wyoming – west

Protected areas
 Oliver Reservoir State Recreation Area

Demographics

As of the 2000 United States Census, there were 4,089 people, 1,727 households, and 1,136 families in the county. The population density was 4 people per square mile (2/km2). There were 1,972 housing units at an average density of 2 per square mile (1/km2). The racial makeup of the county was 96.99% White, 0.22% Black or African American, 0.66% Native American, 0.10% Asian, 0.02% Pacific Islander, 0.66% from other races, and 1.35% from two or more races.  3.33% of the population were Hispanic or Latino of any race. 34.3% were of German, 12.2% English, 7.9% Irish, 6.1% American and 5.5% Swedish ancestry.

There were 1,727 households, out of which 26.30% had children under the age of 18 living with them, 56.10% were married couples living together, 6.70% had a female householder with no husband present, and 34.20% were non-families. 30.50% of all households were made up of individuals, and 15.40% had someone living alone who was 65 years of age or older. The average household size was 2.33 and the average family size was 2.89.

The county population contained 24.70% under the age of 18, 5.90% from 18 to 24, 23.00% from 25 to 44, 25.30% from 45 to 64, and 21.00% who were 65 years of age or older. The median age was 43 years. For every 100 females, there were 95.60 males. For every 100 females age 18 and over, there were 91.20 males.

The median income for a household in the county was $30,586, and the median income for a family was $35,880. Males had a median income of $28,300 versus $16,863 for females. The per capita income for the county was $17,525. About 9.10% of families and 11.10% of the population were below the poverty line, including 12.30% of those under age 18 and 5.90% of those age 65 or over.

Communities

City 

 Kimball (county seat)

Villages 

 Bushnell
 Dix

Unincorpoated communities 

 Dolvaoua
 Jacinto
 Oliver
 Owasco

Politics
Kimball County voters are reliably Republican. In only three national elections has the county selected the Democratic Party candidate.

See also
 National Register of Historic Places listings in Kimball County, Nebraska

References

 
Nebraska counties
1888 establishments in Nebraska
Populated places established in 1888